The Oort cloud, sometimes called the Öpik–Oort cloud, first described in 1950 by the Dutch astronomer Jan Oort, is a theoretical concept of a cloud of predominantly icy planetesimals proposed to surround the Sun at distances ranging from 2,000 to 200,000 AU (0.03 to 3.2 light-years). It is divided into two regions: a disc-shaped inner Oort cloud (or Hills cloud) and a spherical outer Oort cloud. Both regions lie beyond the heliosphere and are in interstellar space. The Kuiper belt, the scattered disc and the detached objects, the other three reservoirs of trans-Neptunian objects, are less than one thousandth as far from the Sun as the Oort cloud.

The outer limit of the Oort cloud defines the cosmographic boundary of the Solar System and the extent of the Sun's Hill sphere. The outer Oort cloud is only loosely bound to the Solar System, and thus is easily affected by the gravitational pull both of passing stars and of the Milky Way itself. These forces occasionally dislodge comets from their orbits within the cloud and send them toward the inner Solar System. Based on their orbits, most of the short-period comets may come from the scattered disc, but some short-period comets may have originated from the Oort cloud.

Astronomers conjecture that the matter composing the Oort cloud formed closer to the Sun and was scattered far into space by the gravitational effects of the giant planets early in the Solar System's evolution. Although no confirmed direct observations of the Oort cloud have been made, it may be the source that replenishes most long-period and Halley-type comets entering the inner Solar System, and many of the centaurs and Jupiter-family comets as well.

Hypothesis 
There are two main classes of comet: short-period comets (also called ecliptic comets) and long-period comets (also called nearly isotropic comets). Ecliptic comets have relatively small orbits, below 10 au, and follow the ecliptic plane, the same plane in which the planets lie. All long-period comets have very large orbits, on the order of thousands of au, and appear from every direction in the sky.

A. O. Leuschner in 1907 suggested that many comets believed to have parabolic orbits, and thus making single visits to the solar system, actually had elliptical orbits and would return after very long periods. In 1932 Estonian astronomer Ernst Öpik postulated that long-period comets originated in an orbiting cloud at the outermost edge of the Solar System. Dutch astronomer Jan Oort independently revived the idea in 1950 as a means to resolve a paradox:
 Over the course of the Solar System's existence the orbits of comets are unstable, and eventually dynamics dictate that a comet must either collide with the Sun or a planet or be ejected from the Solar System by planetary perturbations.
 Moreover, their volatile composition means that as they repeatedly approach the Sun, radiation gradually boils the volatiles off until the comet splits or develops an insulating crust that prevents further outgassing.

Thus, Oort reasoned, a comet could not have formed while in its current orbit and must have been held in an outer reservoir for almost all of its existence. He noted that there was a peak in numbers of long-period comets with aphelia (their farthest distance from the Sun) of roughly 20,000 au, which suggested a reservoir at that distance with a spherical, isotropic distribution. Those relatively rare comets with orbits of about 10,000 au have probably gone through one or more orbits through the Solar System and have had their orbits drawn inward by the gravity of the planets.

Structure and composition 

The outer cloud is only weakly bound to the Sun and supplies the long-period (and possibly Halley-type) comets to inside the orbit of Neptune. The inner Oort cloud is also known as the Hills cloud, named after Jack G. Hills, who proposed its existence in 1981. Models predict that the inner cloud should have tens or hundreds of times as many cometary nuclei as the outer halo; it is seen as a possible source of new comets to resupply the tenuous outer cloud as the latter's numbers are gradually depleted. The Hills cloud explains the continued existence of the Oort cloud after billions of years.

Earlier it was thought to be more massive (up to 380 Earth masses), 
but improved knowledge of the size distribution of long-period comets led to lower estimates. No known estimates of the mass of the inner Oort cloud have been published.

If analyses of comets are representative of the whole, the vast majority of Oort-cloud objects consist of ices such as water, methane, ethane, carbon monoxide and hydrogen cyanide. 
However, the discovery of the object , an object whose appearance was consistent with a D-type asteroid in an orbit typical of a long-period comet, prompted theoretical research that suggests that the Oort cloud population consists of roughly one to two percent asteroids. Analysis of the carbon and nitrogen isotope ratios in both the long-period and Jupiter-family comets shows little difference between the two, despite their presumably vastly separate regions of origin. This suggests that both originated from the original protosolar cloud, a conclusion also supported by studies of granular size in Oort-cloud comets and by the recent impact study of Jupiter-family comet Tempel 1.

Origin 
The Oort cloud is thought to have developed after the formation of planets from the primordial protoplanetary disc approximately 4.6 billion years ago. The most widely accepted hypothesis is that the Oort cloud's objects initially coalesced much closer to the Sun as part of the same process that formed the planets and minor planets.  After formation, strong gravitational interactions with young gas giants, such as Jupiter, scattered the objects into extremely wide elliptical or parabolic orbits that were subsequently modified by perturbations from passing stars and giant molecular clouds into long-lived orbits detached from the gas giant region.

Recent research has been cited by NASA hypothesizing that a large number of Oort cloud objects are the product of an exchange of materials between the Sun and its sibling stars as they formed and drifted apart and it is suggested that many—possibly the majority—of Oort cloud objects did not form in close proximity to the Sun. Simulations of the evolution of the Oort cloud from the beginnings of the Solar System to the present suggest that the cloud's mass peaked around 800 million years after formation, as the pace of accretion and collision slowed and depletion began to overtake supply.

Models by Julio Ángel Fernández suggest that the scattered disc, which is the main source for periodic comets in the Solar System, might also be the primary source for Oort cloud objects. According to the models, about half of the objects scattered travel outward toward the Oort cloud, whereas a quarter are shifted inward to Jupiter's orbit, and a quarter are ejected on hyperbolic orbits. The scattered disc might still be supplying the Oort cloud with material. A third of the scattered disc's population is likely to end up in the Oort cloud after 2.5 billion years.

Computer models suggest that collisions of cometary debris during the formation period play a far greater role than was previously thought. According to these models, the number of collisions early in the Solar System's history was so great that most comets were destroyed before they reached the Oort cloud. Therefore, the current cumulative mass of the Oort cloud is far less than was once suspected. The estimated mass of the cloud is only a small part of the 50–100 Earth masses of ejected material.

Gravitational interaction with nearby stars and galactic tides modified cometary orbits to make them more circular. This explains the nearly spherical shape of the outer Oort cloud. On the other hand, the Hills cloud, which is bound more strongly to the Sun, has not acquired a spherical shape. Recent studies have shown that the formation of the Oort cloud is broadly compatible with the hypothesis that the Solar System formed as part of an embedded cluster of 200–400 stars. These early stars likely played a role in the cloud's formation, since the number of close stellar passages within the cluster was much higher than today, leading to far more frequent perturbations.

In June 2010 Harold F. Levison and others suggested on the basis of enhanced computer simulations that the Sun "captured comets from other stars while it was in its birth cluster." Their results imply that "a substantial fraction of the Oort cloud comets, perhaps exceeding 90%, are from the protoplanetary discs of other stars." In July 2020 Amir Siraj and Avi Loeb found that a captured origin for the Oort Cloud in the Sun's birth cluster could address the theoretical tension in explaining the observed ratio of outer Oort cloud to scattered disc objects, and in addition could increase the chances of a captured Planet Nine.

Comets 
Comets are thought to have two separate points of origin in the Solar System. Short-period comets (those with orbits of up to 200 years) are generally accepted to have emerged from either the Kuiper belt or the scattered disc, which are two linked flat discs of icy debris beyond Neptune's orbit at 30 au and jointly extending out beyond 100 au from the Sun. Very long-period comets, such as C/1999 F1 (Catalina), whose orbits last for millions of years, are thought to originate directly from the outer Oort cloud. Other comets modeled to have come directly from the outer Oort cloud include C/2006 P1 (McNaught), C/2010 X1 (Elenin), Comet ISON, C/2013 A1 (Siding Spring), C/2017 K2, and C/2017 T2 (PANSTARRS). The orbits within the Kuiper belt are relatively stable, and so very few comets are thought to originate there. The scattered disc, however, is dynamically active, and is far more likely to be the place of origin for comets. Comets pass from the scattered disc into the realm of the outer planets, becoming what are known as centaurs. These centaurs are then sent farther inward to become the short-period comets.

There are two main varieties of short-period comet: Jupiter-family comets (those with semi-major axes of less than 5 AU) and Halley-family comets. Halley-family comets, named for their prototype, Halley's Comet, are unusual in that although they are short-period comets, it is hypothesized that their ultimate origin lies in the Oort cloud, not in the scattered disc. Based on their orbits, it is suggested they were long-period comets that were captured by the gravity of the giant planets and sent into the inner Solar System. This process may have also created the present orbits of a significant fraction of the Jupiter-family comets, although the majority of such comets are thought to have originated in the scattered disc.

Oort noted that the number of returning comets was far less than his model predicted, and this issue, known as "cometary fading", has yet to be resolved. No dynamical process is known to explain the smaller number of observed comets than Oort estimated. Hypotheses for this discrepancy include the destruction of comets due to tidal stresses, impact or heating; the loss of all volatiles, rendering some comets invisible, or the formation of a non-volatile crust on the surface. Dynamical studies of hypothetical Oort cloud comets have estimated that their occurrence in the outer-planet region would be several times higher than in the inner-planet region. This discrepancy may be due to the gravitational attraction of Jupiter, which acts as a kind of barrier, trapping incoming comets and causing them to collide with it, just as it did with Comet Shoemaker–Levy 9 in 1994. An example of a typical dynamically old comet with an origin in the Oort cloud could be C/2018 F4.

Tidal effects 

Most of the comets seen close to the Sun seem to have reached their current positions through gravitational perturbation of the Oort cloud by the tidal force exerted by the Milky Way. Just as the Moon's tidal force deforms Earth's oceans, causing the tides to rise and fall, the galactic tide also distorts the orbits of bodies in the outer Solar System. In the charted regions of the Solar System, these effects are negligible compared to the gravity of the Sun, but in the outer reaches of the system, the Sun's gravity is weaker and the gradient of the Milky Way's gravitational field has substantial effects. Galactic tidal forces stretch the cloud along an axis directed toward the galactic center and compress it along the other two axes; these small perturbations can shift orbits in the Oort cloud to bring objects close to the Sun. The point at which the Sun's gravity concedes its influence to the galactic tide is called the tidal truncation radius. It lies at a radius of 100,000 to 200,000 au, and marks the outer boundary of the Oort cloud.

Some scholars theorize that the galactic tide may have contributed to the formation of the Oort cloud by increasing the perihelia (smallest distances to the Sun) of planetesimals with large aphelia (largest distances to the Sun). The effects of the galactic tide are quite complex, and depend heavily on the behaviour of individual objects within a planetary system. Cumulatively, however, the effect can be quite significant: up to 90% of all comets originating from the Oort cloud may be the result of the galactic tide. Statistical models of the observed orbits of long-period comets argue that the galactic tide is the principal means by which their orbits are perturbed toward the inner Solar System.

Stellar perturbations and stellar companion hypotheses 
Besides the galactic tide, the main trigger for sending comets into the inner Solar System is thought to be interaction between the Sun's Oort cloud and the gravitational fields of nearby stars or giant molecular clouds. The orbit of the Sun through the plane of the Milky Way sometimes brings it in relatively close proximity to other stellar systems. For example, it is hypothesized that 70 thousand years ago, perhaps Scholz's Star passed through the outer Oort cloud (although its low mass and high relative velocity limited its effect). During the next 10 million years the known star with the greatest possibility of perturbing the Oort cloud is Gliese 710. This process could also scatter Oort cloud objects out of the ecliptic plane, potentially also explaining its spherical distribution.

In 1984, physicist Richard A. Muller postulated that the Sun has an as-yet undetected companion, either a brown dwarf or a red dwarf, in an elliptical orbit within the Oort cloud. This object, known as Nemesis, was hypothesized to pass through a portion of the Oort cloud approximately every 26 million years, bombarding the inner Solar System with comets. However, to date no evidence of Nemesis has been found, and many lines of evidence (such as crater counts), have thrown its existence into doubt. Recent scientific analysis no longer supports the idea that extinctions on Earth happen at regular, repeating intervals. Thus, the Nemesis hypothesis is no longer needed to explain current assumptions.

A somewhat similar hypothesis was advanced by astronomer John J. Matese of the University of Louisiana at Lafayette in 2002. He contends that more comets are arriving in the inner Solar System from a particular region of the postulated Oort cloud than can be explained by the galactic tide or stellar perturbations alone, and that the most likely cause would be a Jupiter-mass object in a distant orbit. This hypothetical gas giant was nicknamed Tyche. The WISE mission, an all-sky survey using parallax measurements in order to clarify local star distances, was capable of proving or disproving the Tyche hypothesis. In 2014, NASA announced that the WISE survey had ruled out any object as they had defined it.

Future exploration 

Space probes have yet to reach the area of the Oort cloud. Voyager 1, the fastest and farthest of the interplanetary space probes currently leaving the Solar System, will reach the Oort cloud in about 300 years and would take about 30,000 years to pass through it. However, around 2025, the radioisotope thermoelectric generators on Voyager 1 will no longer supply enough power to operate any of its scientific instruments, preventing any further exploration by Voyager 1. The other four probes currently escaping the Solar System either are already or are predicted to be non-functional when they reach the Oort cloud.

In the 1980s, there was a concept for a probe that could reach 1,000 AU in 50 years, called TAU; among its missions would be to look for the Oort cloud.

In the 2014 Announcement of Opportunity for the Discovery program, an observatory to detect the objects in the Oort cloud (and Kuiper belt) called the "Whipple Mission" was proposed. It would monitor distant stars with a photometer, looking for transits up to 10,000 AU away. The observatory was proposed for halo orbiting around L2 with a suggested 5-year mission. It was also suggested that the Kepler observatory could have been capable of detecting objects in the Oort cloud.

See also 

 Heliosphere
 Interstellar comet
 List of possible dwarf planets
 List of trans-Neptunian objects
 Planets beyond Neptune
 Scattered disc
 Tyche (hypothetical planet)
 Nemesis (hypothetical star)

References

Explanatory notes

External links 

 Oort Cloud Profile  by NASA's Solar System Exploration
 
 
 

 
Astronomical hypotheses
Comets
Oort Cloud (proposed its existence)
Hypothetical trans-Neptunian objects
Jan Oort
Minor planets
Trans-Neptunian region
Circumstellar disks